A last resort is something that is used when all other options have been exhausted. Last Resort or The Last Resort may refer to:

Arts, entertainment, and media

Films
 Last Resort (1986 film), starring Charles Grodin—a comedy set on a tropical island
 Last Resort (2000 film), a film directed by Pawel Pawlikowski—a young Russian woman abandoned in a British seaside town
 National Lampoon's Last Resort, a 1994 direct-to-video comedy set on a Caribbean island
 The Last Resort (2018 film), 2018 documentary about Miami Beach
 The Last Resort, a 2016 documentary about a beach in Trieste, Italy.

Gaming
Last Resort (video game), a 1992 video game for the Neo-Geo system
Last Resort, a multiplayer map in Halo 3
The Last Resort (adventure), for the role-playing game Marvel Super Heroes
9: The Last Resort, a 1996 adventure computer game

Literature
The Last Resort (book), travel book about Zimbabwe by Douglas Rogers
The Last Resort (Doctor Who), a 2003 novel based on the Doctor Who series
The Last Resort (Nancy Drew/Hardy Boys), a 1990 novel for children and teenagers

Music
The Last Resort (album), a 2006 album by the Danish electronic musician Trentemøller
"Last Resort" (song), a song by Papa Roach from their 2000 album Infest
"Last Resort", a song by Katatonia on the 1998 album Discouraged Ones
"The Last Resort" (Eagles song), a song by the Eagles from the 1976 album Hotel California
 "The Last Resort" (T. Graham Brown song), 1988
 The Last Resort, Oi! band
 The Last Resort (EP)

Television

Series
 Last Resort (TV series), a 2012–13 American drama television series created by Shawn Ryan and  Karl Gajdusek
 The Last Resort (1988 TV series), a 1988–89 Australian drama television series
 The Last Resort (2017 TV series), a 2017 Australian reality television series
 The Last Resort (American TV series), a 1979–80 American sitcom
 The Last Resort with Jonathan Ross, 1987–90 British talk show

Episodes
 "Last Resort" (House), a 2008 episode of the fifth season of House
 "Last Resort", a 1993 episode of the first season of Sailor Moon
 "The Last Resort", a 1993 episode of Adventures of Sonic the Hedgehog
 "The Last Resort", a 1999 episode Sonic Underground
 "The Last Resort", a 2003 episode of the ninth episode of Sonic X
 "The Last Resort" (Lego Ninjago: Masters of Spinjitzu), a 2016 episode of Lego Ninjago: Masters of Spinjitzu

Other arts, entertainment, and media
 The Last Resort (comics), a limited-series by Justin Gray, Jimmy Palmiotti and Giancarlo Caracuzzo

Other uses
LastResort, a font created by Apple, Inc., used to display Unicode text

See also
Drug of last resort, a medicine used only when all other options are exhausted
Employer of last resort, who hire workers without other options
Gateway of last resort, another name for the default route in computer networks
Last resort rule, part of the decision-making process in U.S. federal courts
Lender of last resort, an institution such as a central bank willing to extend credit when no one else will
Letters of last resort, hand-written by the Prime Minister of the United Kingdom
Operator of last resort, a type of government-backed or owned company in the United Kingdom that operates a railway franchise in the event that a train operating company is no longer able to do so